= Polonium diiodide =

Identifiers
CAS Number	61716-26-5
3D model (JSmol)	Interactive image
PubChem CID	154173812
- InChI: InChI=1S/2HI.Po/h2*1H;/q;;+2/p-2 Key: KSYSHPVSQUKRJA-UHFFFAOYSA-L
- SMILES: I[Po]I

Properties
Chemical formula	I_{2}Po
Molar mass	463 g·mol^{−1}
- Except where otherwise noted, data are given for materials in their standard state (at 25 °C [77 °F], 100 kPa). Infobox references

Polonium diiodide is a binary inorganic compound of polonium metal and iodine with the chemical formula PoI_{2}.

Thermal Reactions of Polonium A.S.Abakumov Russian Chemical Reviews, 51 (7), 1982 U.D.C. 546.794 + 541.11 Published information on the interaction of polonium with the chemical elements has been surveyed and systematised. Attention is paid to specific features of experimental methods for investigating the properties of polonium compounds. Conditions for the direct synthesis of binary polonium compounds and their thermal properties are given. The applicability of the Samsonov classification of chalcogenides to polonium compounds is shown. Bibliography of 43 references. CONTENTS I. Introduction II. Methods of investigation III. Chemical and physical properties of polonium IV. Interaction of polonium with the chemical elements V. Conclusion 622 622 623 624 628 I. INTRODUCTION The first papers containing communications about phenomena connected with thermal reactions between polonium and chemical elements1 · 2 appeared in 1932. Rona1 studied the influence of the material of the substrate on which polonium had been deposited electrochemically on the vaporisation of the polonium; vaporisation starts at 280 °C from a gold substrate, at 300 °C from a platinum substrate, and at 550 °C from a palladium one. After a specimen of polonium on a gold substrate had been stored for five months the temperature for the start of the vaporisation of the polonium had increased to 400 °C. Tamman and Ldwis of Menar2 investigated the behaviour of poloniun during the crystallisation of metals by melting filings of silver, copper, lead, bismuth, tin, antimony, cadmium, zinc, or tellurium on which trace amounts of polonium had been deposited electrochemically. Radiographic study of sections of the ingots showed that the polonium is located at the grain boundaries of the metals; it was concluded that polonium differs from other metals in its insignificant tendency to form solid solutions. The systematic investigation of the thermal reactions between polonium and the chemical elements was begun after milligramme amounts of it had been obtained by irradiating bismuth in atomic reactors. Detailed information about polonium and its compounds (discovery, distribution, methods of production, physical and chemical properties, state and behaviour in solutions, electrochemistry, analytical chemistry, applications, and safety techniques) has been given in monographs3 " 8 . Early American work was surveyed in a review paper 9 .

The present review deals with thermal reactions between polonium and the chemical elements which proceed in the interaction of polonium vapour with the liquid or solid elements or the interaction of the gaseous elements with metallic polonium. This information is scattered in the earlier literature. Special attention is paid to works which have appeared in the last decade (after the reviews mentioned above were written). Many experimental investigations have shown that in accordance with its position in the Mendeleev Periodic Table polonium and its compounds exhibit properties close to those of the other chalcogens (especially to tellurium) and their compounds; consequently the material is presented mainly in accordance with the scientific classification of the chalcogenides proposed by Samsonov10 . I I. METHODS OF INVESTIGATION The use of many contemporary methods of investigation is restricted in working with milligramme amounts of polonium210 because of the high toxicity of polonium, its ability to form radioactive aerosols, and its tendency to migrate along surfaces; it is also necessary to allow for its high energy release (144 W g" 1 ), the destructive power of the nuclear recoil during radioactive decay (166 TBk g"1 ) [sic.

The energy of the recoiling nucleus is 100 keV (Ed.of Translation)], and the constant accumulation of the radiogenic lead206 in the specimens (0.5% per 24 h). In addition, the strong α-emission of the polonium brings about ozonisation of the atmospheric oxygen, leading to intense oxidation of the specimens. In working with gramme amounts of polonium the radiogenic heating of the specimens is so great that forced cooling of them is necessary. Safety control of the investigations imposes limitations on the choice of methods (the possibility of carrying out the experiment in gloveboxes, simplicity of the equipment, hermetic sealing of the specimens, and remoteness of the quantitative and qualitative determinations), Direct vacuum-thermal synthesis 1 1 in the various versions used industrially was employed in most studies of the interaction of polonium vapour with the chemical elements. In some papers 1 2 it is called the differential-thermal or ampoule method. X-Ray powder diffraction, metallographic (determination of the microhardness of layers and their dimensions), and tensimetric (various versions) methods were used for studying some of the properties of the polonium compounds obtained.

The composition of the vapour during the heating of the specimens was usually determined by the simplest method—from the sublimation temperature of the condensed vapour. In some investigations the atomic ratio of a component of the vapour was found by using radioactive nucleides and determining their amounts with a γ-spectrometer or the mass characteristics of the vapour found with a mass spectrometer. The melting points of the lanthanide polonides were determined with an optical pyrometer from the change in the emissivity of tungsten when the powder of the compound being studied was deposited on it. The amount of polonium in the specimens was determined calorimetrically or radiometrically.
